Campo, Ticino may refer to:

 Campo, Vallemaggia, a municipality in Vallemaggia Valley, Switzerland
 Campo Blenio, an old municipality now incorporated in Blenio municipality, in Blenio Valley, Switzerland